The New Show is an NBC sketch comedy show produced by Lorne Michaels that ran for one season from January 6 to March 23, 1984. Apart from being 60 minutes in length and entirely pre-recorded, the show is similar in format to Michaels' own Saturday Night Live. It was the lowest-rated of 94 programs that aired during the 1983–84 television season, averaging a 7.81 household rating. It was scheduled opposite Matt Houston and Falcon Crest.

The show was Michaels' second network television show created after Saturday Night Live. Several former original cast members and hosts from SNLs 1970s era made appearances throughout the series' short run, including Laraine Newman, Gilda Radner, Steve Martin, and Buck Henry. After NBC cancelled The New Show, Michaels would return to SNL as executive producer in 1985.

Cast
 Valri Bromfield
 Buck Henry
 Dave Thomas

US television ratings

Episodes 

1984 - s01e10 - Best Of (Special)

References

External links
 
 The New Show on the SCTV website

1984 American television series debuts
1984 American television series endings
NBC original programming
1980s American sketch comedy television series
1980s American variety television series